Grace Garland (born in New York City) is an American singer-songwriter and actress. She rose to fame in the early 1980s playing Vera Vanderbilt on the TV series All My Children. She later went on to become a series regular on The Apollo Comedy Hour (1993–1995) TV series filmed at the famous Harlem Apollo Theater. She has played a number of notable film roles, including Q's (Omar Epps) mother in Juice (1992), and Dr. Love in 30 Years to Life. She also made a guest appearance on The Cosby Show (1992) playing Maxine. She was an original cast member in the off-Broadway hit musical The Last Session, playing Diva, and appears on the Original Cast Recording as this role.

Garland released a solo album titled Lovers Never Lie (In Bed) (2005) and penned her first book titled Loneliness Makes You Stupid! – The Grown Woman's Dating Guide (Part 1) (2006).

Discography

Albums
Lovers Never Lie (In Bed) (2005)
Lady G! (2016)

Singles
"Single Mingle Jingle" (2006)
"I'll Cry Later" (2016), A Global Music Award Winner, Silver Medal – Female Jazz Vocals

References

External links 
 Grace Garland Official site
 https://m.imdb.com/name/nm0307525

Living people
Singers from New York City
Actresses from New York City
Year of birth missing (living people)
21st-century American women